AICW may refer to:

 Advanced Individual Combat Weapon
 Atlantic Intracoastal Waterway